Turmero is a city in the state of Aragua in northern Venezuela. It is the capital of Santiago Mariño Municipality.

The city was officially established on 27 November 1620 with the founding of a church, Iglesia Nuestra Señora de Candelaria, in an existing village.

Landmarks
Universidad Bicentenaria de Aragua (established in 1986)
La Encrucijada de Turmero

Notable people
Francisco José Cróquer (1920–1955), sportscaster and racing driver
Balbino Blanco Sánchez (1925-1990), journalist, poet
William Cuevas (born 1990), professional baseball player
Francisco Linares Alcántara (1825–1878), President of Venezuela
Yohan Pino (born 1983), professional baseball player
Abraham Torres (born 1968), Olympic boxer
José Luis Valbuena (born 1971), Pan American Games boxer
Stephanie de Zorzi (born 1993), Model and Miss Earth Venezuela 2016

Sources
Turmero – Historia, geografía, personajes y cultura (Spanish)
Turmero – Historia, huellas y testimonio (Spanish)

1620 establishments in the Spanish Empire
Cities in Aragua
Populated places established in 1620